Cyrillia is a genus of sea snails, marine gastropod mollusks in the family Raphitomidae.

Description
The shells are rather small (5 to 10 mm), showing a reticulate structure. The aperture is piriform. The outer lip is slightly crenulate, within incrassate and distinctly denticulate.

Species
 Cyrillia aequalis (Jeffreys, 1867)
 Cyrillia ephesina (Pusateri, Giannuzzi-Savelli & Stahlschmidt, 2017)
  † Cyrillia georgesi (Ceulemans, Van Dingenen & Landau, 2018)
 Cyrillia kabuli (Rolán, Otero-Schmitt & F. Fernandes, 1998)
 Cyrillia linearis (Montagu, 1803)
 † Cyrillia michalidesi Landau, Van Dingenen & Ceulemans, 2020 
 Cyrillia obesa (Høisæter, 2016)
 Cyrillia zamponorum (Horro, Gori & Rolán, 2019)

References

External links
 Smith E.H. (1967). Two new species of British turrids. The Veliger. 10(1): 1-4
 Monterosato T. A. (di) (1884). Nomenclatura generica e specifica di alcune conchiglie mediterranee. Palermo, Virzi, 152 pp
 Fassio, G.; Russini, V.; Pusateri, F.; Giannuzzi-Savelli, R.; Høisæter, T.; Puillandre, N.; Modica, M. V.; Oliverio, M. (2019). An assessment of Raphitoma and allied genera (Neogastropoda: Raphitomidae). Journal of Molluscan Studies

 
Raphitomidae
Gastropod genera